Aimee Rachel Osbourne (born 2 September 1983) is an English actress and singer. She is the eldest daughter of Ozzy and Sharon Osbourne. Her father Ozzy also has three older children from his previous 11-year marriage to his first wife Thelma Riley, one of whom is adopted. Aimee is Ozzy's second daughter, the oldest being half-sister Jessica. While her younger siblings Jack and Kelly achieved pop culture fame for appearing in the family's MTV reality series The Osbournes, Aimee declined to appear on the show, feeling that doing so would typecast her and affect her musical career. She has expressed discomfort with some of her parents' behaviour on television.

Career 
In 1991, Osbourne appeared as a child in some videos and documentaries relating to her father's musical career, and appeared on The Howard Stern Show in 1998, but did not reach mainstream acting success until being cast in MTV's 2003 adaptation of Wuthering Heights. She later provided voiceover work in the 2014 animated film Postman Pat: The Movie.

Around 2010, she began recording and releasing music under the project name ARO (her initials). ARO, in contrast to her father's heavy metal, has been described as synth pop, and is influenced by Kate Bush and Portishead, as well as PJ Harvey and Massive Attack. She has appeared in her own music videos, and her video for "Raining Gold" received two million hits in just two months.

ARO so far have performed only three live shows. Union Pool, Brooklyn on 1 April 2015, Mercury Lounge, New York City, on 2 April 2015 and The Echo, Los Angeles, on 9 February 2016.

In 2016, after releasing three songs "Raining Gold", "I Can Change" and "Cocaine Style", updates on the project started to become few and far between. On 17 October 2018, ARO announced on their official Instagram page that an EP was in the works thanking the fans for their patience. ARO teased new material on Instagram on 5 December 2018 with a snippet of a song called "Beats of My Heart". As of 2020 neither the EP or the single have been released and no new updates regarding the band had been released which suggests the band was either on hiatus or broken up.

On 13 February 2020, ARO posted their first update in over a year stating "Thank you all so much for your interest. Not long to go now". The post also revealed the debut album will be released on indie record label "Makerecords". On 24 July 2020, ARO released their first single in four years "Shared Something With the Night". Osbourne revealed the title of ARO's upcoming LP to be Vacare Adamaré and that they plan to release it in "EP-like chapters, built around videos for each song". Speaking of upcoming live shows she stated: "I want the live show to feel like you’re on the haunted mansion ride at Disneyland, with a little Studio 54, a touch of vaudeville and a lot of Blade Runner. It will be ghostly and poetic with some neon and hypnotic laser lights to captivate all the senses." 

In May 2022, Aimee narrowly escaped a fire in a Hollywood recording studio. She was saved by fellow record producer and rapper Jamal Rajad. While Osbourne and Rajad survived, producer Nathan Avery Edwards, Rajad's friend, was killed in the blaze, along with Rajad's four cats. Two other people experienced minor smoke inhalation.

Personal life 
Osbourne's maternal grandfather was the English music manager Don Arden (Harry Levy). She is of partial English, Irish and Jewish descent.

ARO band members
Aimée Osbourne - lead vocals (2015-present)
Billy Mohler - guitar, bass (2015-present)
Rene Arsenault - keyboards, programming (2015-present) 
Brendan Buckey - drums (2015-present)

Discography

ARO
Studio albums
Vacare Adamaré (2020)

Singles
"Raining Gold" (2015)
"I Can Change" (LCD Soundsystem cover) (2016)
"Cocaine Style" (2016)
"Shared Something With the Night" (2020)
"House of Lies" (2020)
"Against Mine" (2022)

Other
Officially Osbourne: Opening the Doors to the Land of Oz (2002) (Audiobook narration)

Filmography 
The Joan Rivers Show (1991) - Herself (Episode: Rock & Roll Dads)
Ozzy Osbourne: Don't Blame Me (1991) - Herself
Behind the Music (1998) - Herself (Episode: Ozzy Osbourne)
Howard Stern (1998) - Herself (2 Episodes)
Intimate Portrait (2002) - Herself (Episode: Sharon Osbourne)
The Osbournes (2002–03) - Herself (9 Uncredited appearances with her face blurred out)
Wuthering Heights (2003) - Raquelle
Biography (2007) - Herself (Episode: Ozzy Osbourne)
God Bless Ozzy Osbourne (2011) - Herself
Postman Pat: The Movie (2014) - Amy Wrigglesworth
Biography: Nine Lives of Ozzy Osbourne (2020) - Herself

References

External links 
 

1983 births
Living people
21st-century American singers
21st-century British actresses
21st-century English actresses
21st-century English singers
21st-century English women singers
Actresses from London
American synth-pop musicians
English film actresses
English people of Irish descent
English people of Jewish descent
English television actresses
English voice actresses
Aimée
Singers from London
Singers from Los Angeles